opened in Hōfu, Yamaguchi Prefecture, Japan, in 1966. It occupies part of the Former Mōri Clan Main Residence, dating from the Meiji and Taishō periods, of which twelve component structures have been jointly designated an Important Cultural Property and the gardens a Place of Scenic Beauty. The collection of some twenty thousand objects includes four National Treasures, nine Important Cultural Properties, and nine Prefectural Cultural Properties.

National Treasures
The four National Treasures are Heian-period scrolls from Records of the Grand Historian and Kokin Wakashū, a Kamakura-period sword, and Sesshū's Long Landscape Scroll.

See also
 Hōfu Tenman-gū
 Landscape by Sesshū (Ōhara Collection)
 List of Cultural Properties of Japan - paintings (Yamaguchi)
 List of Places of Scenic Beauty of Japan (Yamaguchi)
 List of National Treasures of Japan (writings: Chinese books)
 List of National Treasures of Japan (writings: Japanese books)
 List of National Treasures of Japan (crafts: swords)
 List of National Treasures of Japan (paintings)
 Yamaguchi Prefectural Museum

References

External links

  Mōri Museum
  Mōri Gardens and Museum

Museums in Yamaguchi Prefecture
Hōfu, Yamaguchi
Mōri clan
Museums established in 1966
1966 establishments in Japan